David Levering Lewis (born May 25, 1936) is an American historian, a Julius Silver University Professor, and a professor of history at New York University. He is twice winner of the Pulitzer Prize for Biography or Autobiography, for part one and part two of his biography of W. E. B. Du Bois (in 1994 and 2001, respectively). He is the first author to win Pulitzer Prizes for biography for two successive volumes on the same subject.

The author of eight books and editor of two more, Lewis concentrates on comparative history with special focus on twentieth-century United States social history and civil rights. His interests include nineteenth-century Africa, twentieth-century France, and Islamic Spain.

Life
Lewis was born in 1936 in Little Rock, Arkansas to a middle-class African-American family. His father John Henry Lewis, Sr. had graduated from Morris Brown College in Atlanta, and went on to Yale Divinity School, becoming its first African-American graduate. He also earned an M.A. in sociology from the University of Chicago. He became principal of Dunbar Junior and Senior High School and Junior College in Little Rock.  Lewis' mother taught high school math in the school.

While the family lived in Little Rock, the young Lewis attended parochial school.  Lewis attended Wilberforce Preparatory School and Xenia High School after his father became Dean of the Theological School at Wilberforce University in Wilberforce, Ohio.

When the family moved to Atlanta after his father became President of Morris Brown College, Lewis attended Booker T. Washington High School in his junior year. He gained early admission at age fifteen to Fisk University in Nashville, Tennessee. He graduated Phi Beta Kappa in 1956.

Lewis briefly attended the University of Michigan Law School but left to attend Columbia University, where he earned his M.A. in history in 1959. He went to the London School of Economics for his doctorate, earning his Ph.D. in 1962 in modern European and French history.

In 1961–1962, Lewis served in the United States Army as a psychiatric technician and private first class in Landstuhl, Germany.

Lewis has three adult children (Eric, Allison, and Jason) from his first marriage.

Academic career
In 1963, Lewis lectured at the University of Ghana on medieval African history. After returning to the United States, Lewis taught at Morgan State University, the University of Notre Dame, Howard University, and the University of the District of Columbia from 1970 to 1980 as associate and full professor. Lewis was professor of history at University of California at San Diego from 1980 to 1984.

In 1985, Lewis joined Rutgers University as the Martin Luther King Jr. Professor of History, where he wrote his Pulitzer Prize-winning two volume-biography of W. E. B. Du Bois and finished writing The Race to Fashoda: European Colonialism and African Resistance in the Scramble for Africa during his 18-year tenure.

In spring semester 2001, Lewis served as distinguished visiting professor in Harvard's history department.

In 2003, Lewis was appointed and currently serves as the Julius Silver University Professor and Professor of History at New York University.

He has received fellowships from the Center for Advanced Study in the Behavioral Sciences, the National Humanities Center, the Woodrow Wilson International Center for Scholars, the John Simon Guggenheim Foundation, the American Philosophical Society, and the John D. and Catherine T. MacArthur Foundation.

Professional career
Lewis is the author of the first academic biography of Martin Luther King Jr., which was published in 1970, less than two years after the subject's assassination. His Prisoners of Honor: The Dreyfus Affair was published in 1974; The Bicentennial History of the District of Columbia was published in 1976; and When Harlem Was in Vogue in 1980. Lewis wrote his Pulitzer Prize-winning two volume-biography of W. E. B. Du Bois during his 18-year tenure at Rutgers.

Besides the two Pulitzer Prizes for his volumes on W. E. B. Du Bois, published in 1994 and 2001, Lewis in 1994 won the Bancroft Prize and the Francis Parkman Prize for his first volume. In 2001 he also won the Anisfield-Wolf Book Award for his second volume on Du Bois, published that year.

He is a former trustee of the National Humanities Center, former commissioner of the National Portrait Gallery, and a former senator of Phi Beta Kappa.

Lewis appeared as a historical expert in the 1999 film New York: A Documentary Film, directed by Ric Burns for PBS and The African Americans: Many Rivers to Cross 2013 documentary miniseries written and presented by Henry Louis Gates Jr. for PBS.

He was president of the Society of American Historians in 2002, and is a board member of the magazine The Crisis, published by the NAACP. He is a fellow of the American Academy of Arts and Sciences and the American Philosophical Society. He was an Ellen Maria Gorrissen Fellow at the American Academy in Berlin, Germany, in spring 2008.

President Barack Obama awarded him the 2009 National Humanities Medal at the White House on February 25, 2010. Lewis delivered the inaugural convocation lecture at New York University Abu Dhabi in the United Arab Emirates on September 19, 2010.

Books by David Levering Lewis

 ; Univ. of Illinois Press, 1979.
 Prisoners of Honor: The Dreyfus Affair, William Morrow, 1974.
 District of Columbia: A Bicentennial History, W.W. Norton, 1976.
 The Race for Fashoda: European Colonialism and African Resistance in The Scramble for Africa. New York: Weidenfeld and Nicolson, 1987 
 David L. Lewis (ed.) The Portable Harlem Renaissance Reader, Viking, 1994, 
 
 When Harlem Was in Vogue New York: Knopf, 1981, 
  Winner of the 1994 Pulitzer Prize for Biography, and winner also of the Bancroft and Parkman prizes.
  Winner of the 2001 Pulitzer Prize for Biography and the Anisfield-Wolf Book Award
 
 (with Deborah Willis) A Small Nation of People: W. E. B. Du Bois & African American Portraits of Progress, HarperCollins, 2003.
 God's Crucible: Islam and the Making of Europe, 570-1215, (New York: W. W. Norton and Company, 2008)
 
 The Implausible Wendell Willkie: Leadership Ahead of Its Time in Walter Isaacson (ed.) Profiles in Leadership (W. W. Norton & Company, 2011)

References

External links
"W.E.B. DuBois as a Historical Novelist" Audio recording: David Levering Lewis at the Key West Literary Seminar, 2009
"Pulitzer Prize for Biography: David Levering Lewis", with Gwen Ifill, PBS Newshour, 23 April 2001
Lewis On How Harlem Became A Place For African Americans, PBS WNET, New York

Interview with Lewis, In Depth, 3 February 2008, C-SPAN

1936 births
African-American academics
African-American educators
Living people
Historians of race relations
21st-century American historians
21st-century American male writers
American biographers
Bancroft Prize winners
Pulitzer Prize for Biography or Autobiography winners
MacArthur Fellows
Fisk University alumni
University of Michigan Law School alumni
Columbia Graduate School of Arts and Sciences alumni
Rutgers University faculty
Alumni of the London School of Economics
Writers from Arkansas
Writers from New York (state)
Writers from Little Rock, Arkansas
Academic staff of the University of Ghana
Howard University faculty
University of California, San Diego faculty
Harvard University faculty
New York University faculty
National Humanities Medal recipients
Academic staff of New York University Abu Dhabi
Academics from Arkansas
United States Army soldiers
American male non-fiction writers
21st-century African-American writers
20th-century African-American people
African-American male writers